Lot and his Daughters, or Lot and his Daughters, with Sodom and Gomorrah Burning is a subject in art showing Lot from the Hebrew Bible and his two daughters.

Examples with articles include:  
Lot and His Daughters (anonymous), c. 1520
Lot and His Daughters (Orazio Gentileschi, Los Angeles)
Lot and His Daughters (Orazio Gentileschi, Berlin)
Lot and His Daughters (Orazio Gentileschi, Madrid)
Lot and His Daughters (Orazio Gentileschi, Bilbao)
Lot and His Daughters (Orazio Gentileschi, Ottawa)
Lot and His Daughters (Vouet), Simon Vouet, 1633
Lot and His Daughters (Artemisia Gentileschi, 1635-1638)
The Destruction of Sodom and Gomorrah, John Martin, 1852
Lot and his Daughters, with Sodom and Gomorrah Burning (miniature from Transylvania) miniature in a Bible from Transylvania, 1842